Walter Forbes (born 1942/43) is an American corporate executive and former Federal prisoner.

He was prosecuted by the U.S. Attorney's Office for the District of New Jersey and convicted of one count of conspiracy to commit securities fraud, and two counts of making false statements, for inflating reported incomes for the Cendant Corporation, when he was Chief Executive Officer of that company in the 1990s, and at its predecessor company CUC International.

On 2007 January 17, the 64-year-old Forbes was sentenced to over 12 years in prison, and ordered to make restitution amounting to $3.28 billion.  Former vice chairman E. Kirk Shelton was ordered to pay the same figure.  Forbes was released from prison on July 20, 2018.

One Department of Justice website describes this as the largest restitution order ever imposed as of July 2007.  It has since been overtaken by the $170 billion restitution order against Bernard Madoff in June 2009.

Walter Forbes has no relation to the Boston Forbes family or the family that owns and publishes Forbes magazine.

He graduated from The Hill School (class of 1961), Northwestern University and Harvard Business School.

References 

1940s births
Living people
Corporate crime
Year of birth uncertain
American white-collar criminals
People convicted of making false statements
American businesspeople convicted of crimes
20th-century American businesspeople
Northwestern University alumni
Harvard Business School alumni